Arthur José Ribas Elias (born 5 August 1981), known as Arthur Elias, is a Brazilian football manager, currently in charge of Corinthians (women).

Career
Born in São Paulo, Arthur Elias began his career in 2006, with the women's team of the University of São Paulo, after previously studying in the university and working in women's futsal. In 2009, he was offered a managerial role at the women's side of Nacional AC.

In 2010, after two seasons in charge of Nacional, Arthur Elias joined Centro Olímpico as a supervisor, and became the manager of the women's team in the following year. He led the side to their first ever Campeonato Brasileiro title in 2013, and took over Audax under the same role in 2015.

Arthur Elias led Audax to the Copa do Brasil de Futebol Feminino title in 2016, and to the Copa Libertadores Femenina title in 2017, both when the women's team had a partnership with Corinthians. Ahead of the 2018 season, as Corinthians opted to reactivate their own women's side, he was named as their manager.

On 18 December 2019, Arthur Elias renewed his contract for the 2020 season.

Honours

Club
Centro Olímpico
Campeonato Brasileiro de Futebol Feminino Série A1: 2013

Corinthians
Copa Libertadores Femenina: 2017, 2019, 2021
Campeonato Brasileiro de Futebol Feminino Série A1: 2018, 2020, 2021, 2022
Copa do Brasil de Futebol Feminino: 2016
Supercopa do Brasil Feminina: 2022
Campeonato Paulista de Futebol Feminino: 2019, 2020, 2021
 2022

Individual
Bola de Prata Best Coach: 2021, 2022
Campeonato Brasileiro de Futebol Feminino Série A1 Coach of the Year: 2021
IFFHS World's Best Club Coach CONMEBOL: 2021

References

Notes

1981 births
Living people
Sportspeople from São Paulo
Brazilian football managers
Sport Club Corinthians Paulista (women) managers